Västra Valla is a city district in western Linköping. Västra Valla includes the campus of Linköping University.

Districts adjoining Västra Valla are East Valla, Gottfridsberg, Garnisonen, Lambohov, Mjärdevi, Djurgården and Ryd.

Geography of Linköping